Tricia O'Neil (born Patty O'Neil) is an American actress.

Early life
Born in Shreveport, Louisiana, she is the daughter of Mr. and Mrs. J. W. O'Neil. The family lived in El Paso, Texas, from 1952 to 1959 and in 1963. O'Neil attended elementary and intermediate schools in El Paso and graduated from McAllen High School. She graduated from Baylor University in 1968

O'Neil changed her first name from Patty because Actors Equity already had a Patty O'Neil registered.

Career
O'Neil began her career as a model and cover girl before turning to acting. She first appeared in television commercials. She sang in supper clubs in Texas and California for two years before an opportunity to act on Broadway arose.

O'Neil received a Theatre World Award for her performance in the 1970 production of the Broadway musical Two by Two. That role was her professional theatrical debut.

O'Neil made her film debut in the 1972 film The Legend of Nigger Charley (1972). Other film appearances include The Gumball Rally (1976), Mary Jane Harper Cried Last Night (1977), Are You in the House Alone? (1978), The Kid from Left Field (1979), Brave New World (1980), Piranha II: The Spawning (1982), Ted & Venus (1991) and Titanic (1997).

O'Neil made her television debut in the 1973 television movie Duty Bound. She appeared in a number of guest roles on various television series, including a dog trainer in a 1978 episode of Columbo titled "How to Dial a Murder", nightclub singer Julie Heller in the episode "Murder! Murder!" of The Eddie Capra Mysteries (1978), as Dorothy Fulton in Hart to Hart (1979), as a police photographer in back-to-back episodes of Barney Miller (1980), as female stunt woman "Charlie" in the episode of the same name in the first season of The Fall Guy (1981), in Remington Steele (1982), as conniving "other woman" Ashley Vickers in the pilot episode of Murder, She Wrote (1984), as a pushy reporter in the second-season episode "Catch of the Day" in Riptide (1984), as the owner of a travelling Wild West rodeo show in the third-season Airwolf episode "Annie Oakley" (1985), and separate roles in three episodes of Matlock from 1989 to 1994. She appeared in the television miniseries Jacqueline Susann's Valley of the Dolls (1981) and in two episodes of The A-Team, playing Dr. Maggie "Mo" Sullivan in the season one episode "Black Day at Bad Rock" and the season two episode "Deadly Maneuvers".

O'Neil made a number of appearances in popular science fiction television series during the 1980s and 1990s. She portrayed Captain Rachel Garrett of the U.S.S. Enterprise (NCC-1701-C) in the Star Trek: The Next Generation episode "Yesterday's Enterprise", returning to that series with a role as the Klingon Kurak in the episode "Suspicions".  Later she guest-starred on Star Trek: Deep Space Nine as Cardassian Korinas in the episode "Defiant". O'Neil guest-starred in the Babylon 5 season-one episode "Believers" (1994) as "M'ola". Later, she played the Earth Alliance president in the Babylon 5 TV movie Babylon 5: In the Beginning (1998).

In 1991, O'Neil filmed her scenes in the role of Hoelun for the never-released film Genghis Khan. Efforts in 2010 to repackage the material as a miniseries, tentatively named Genghis Khan: The Story of a Lifetime, never came to fruition.

O'Neil's last screen appearance was on the television series JAG, playing Dr. Beth Salluci in the 2001 episode "Redemption".

Personal life
O'Neil married opera singer James Van Valkenburg.

Awards and nominations

References

External links
 
 
 

American television actresses
American film actresses
Living people
American female models
Actors from Shreveport, Louisiana
Actresses from Louisiana
20th-century American actresses
21st-century American women
Year of birth missing (living people)